Ignaz Sigl (11 February 1902 – 9 August 1986) was an Austrian footballer. He played in 24 matches for the Austria national football team from 1925 to 1931.

References

External links
 

1902 births
1986 deaths
Austrian footballers
Austria international footballers
Place of birth missing
Association footballers not categorized by position